Gallon House Bridge (also Gallonhouse Bridge) is a wooden covered bridge spanning Abiqua Creek in rural Marion County, Oregon, United States, built in 1916. The  bridge derived its name during prohibition when it was a meeting place for bootleggers and moonshiners. The bridge was swept off its footings in the December 1964 flood, but was restored immediately after.

See also
List of bridges documented by the Historic American Engineering Record in Oregon
List of bridges on the National Register of Historic Places in Oregon
List of Oregon covered bridges

External links
Historic images of Gallon House Bridge from Salem Public Library
Abiqua Creek (Gallon House) Covered Bridge from Oregon.com

Covered bridges on the National Register of Historic Places in Oregon
Bridges completed in 1916
Historic American Engineering Record in Oregon
National Register of Historic Places in Marion County, Oregon
Transportation buildings and structures in Marion County, Oregon
Wooden bridges in Oregon
Tourist attractions in Marion County, Oregon
1916 establishments in Oregon
Road bridges on the National Register of Historic Places in Oregon